Arturo Enrique Cisneros Bejar (born 28 November 1978) is a Mexican former professional footballer who played as a defender or midfielder. He had stints in the V-League, Ascenso MX, and the Canadian Soccer League.

Career 
Cisneros began his career in his native city with Guerreros Acapulco, where he played for five years, and served as the team's captain. In 2002, he went abroad to Canada to sign with the Montreal Dynamites of the Canadian Professional Soccer League. During his tenure with Montreal he helped the club finish second in the Eastern Conference, and reached the semi-finals in the playoffs. In 2003, Cisneros went overseas to Asia to sign with Tien Giang, and the following year he signed with Ho Chi Minh City F.C. In 2005, he signed with Atlante of the Ascenso MX. On 26 March 2006, he returned to Canada to sign with the Laval Dynamites for the 2006 CSL season. He helped Laval finish third in the National Division, and featured in the quarterfinal match against Toronto Croatia, which resulted in a 1–0 victory for Toronto.

References 

1978 births
Living people
Sportspeople from Acapulco
Mexican footballers
Footballers from Guerrero
Association football defenders
Association football midfielders
Canadian Soccer League (1998–present) players
Atlante F.C. footballers
Laval Dynamites players
Mexican expatriate footballers
Mexican expatriate sportspeople in Vietnam
Expatriate footballers in Vietnam
Mexican expatriate sportspeople in Canada
Expatriate soccer players in Canada